Kaneh Rashid-e Babakhan (also Romanized as Kaneh Rashīd-e Bābākhān; also known as Kandrash-e Bābākhān) is a village in Gurani Rural District, Gahvareh District, Dalahu County, Kermanshah Province, Iran. At the 2006 census, its population was 51, in 13 families.

References 

Populated places in Dalahu County